Birmingham South was a parliamentary constituency in Birmingham which returned one Member of Parliament (MP) to the House of Commons of the Parliament of the United Kingdom from 1885 until it was abolished for the 1918 general election.

Elections were held using the first-past-the-post voting system.

Boundaries 
Before 1885 the city of Birmingham had been a three-member constituency (see Birmingham [UK Parliament constituency] for further details). Under the Redistribution of Seats Act 1885 the parliamentary borough of Birmingham was split into seven single-member divisions, one of which was Birmingham South. It consisted of the wards of Deritend and St Martin, and part of the local government district of Balsall Heath.

The division was bounded to the west by Birmingham Edgbaston, to the north-west by Birmingham Central, to the north by Birmingham East, to the east by Birmingham Bordesley and in the south by the then city boundary and the East Worcestershire constituency.

In the 1918 redistribution of parliamentary seats, the Representation of the People Act 1918 provided for twelve new Birmingham divisions. The South division was abolished.

Members of Parliament

Elections

Elections in the 1880s

Elections in the 1890s

Elections in the 1900s

Elections in the 1910s

General Election 1914–15:

Another General Election was required to take place before the end of 1915. The political parties had been making preparations for an election to take place and by the July 1914, the following candidates had been selected; 
Unionist: Leo Amery
Liberal: John Gibbard Hurst

See also
List of former United Kingdom Parliament constituencies

References

 Boundaries of Parliamentary Constituencies 1885-1972, compiled and edited by F.W.S. Craig (Parliamentary Reference Publications 1972)

Constituencies of the Parliament of the United Kingdom established in 1885
Constituencies of the Parliament of the United Kingdom disestablished in 1918
Parliamentary constituencies in Birmingham, West Midlands (historic)